The Espadas Peak ( or Pico de la Espada) is a mountain on the Spanish side of the Pyrenees, in Grist, Sahún municipality, in the north of Ribagorza comarca, Aragon. This mountain is one of the highest in the Pyrenees.

This peak is located close to Pico Posets in an area of many high summits.

References

External links
Pico Espadas, 3332 mts, desde Biados

Mountains of the Pyrenees
Mountains of Aragon